The 1973 European Weightlifting Championships were held in Madrid, Spain from June 10 to June 18, 1973. This was the 52nd edition of the event. There were 130 men in action from 23 nations.

Medal summary
{| 
|-
!colspan=7|52 kg
|-
|Snatch
||| 97.5 kg
||| 90.0 kg
||| 90.0 kg
|-
|Clean & Jerk
||| 127.5 kg
||| 127.5 kg
||| 125.0 kg
|-bgcolor=#dfefff
|Total
||| 225.0 kg||| 217.5 kg
||| 210.0 kg|-
!colspan=7|56 kg
|-
|Snatch
||| 110.0 kg
||| 110.0 kg
||| 107.5 kg
|-
|Clean & Jerk
||| 147.5 kg
||| 142.5 kg
||| 142.5 kg
|-bgcolor=#dfefff
|Total||| 255.0 kg
||| 252.5 kg||| 250.0 kg
|-
!colspan=7|60 kg
|-
|Snatch
||| 122.5 kg
||| 122.5 kg
||| 120.0 kg
|-
|Clean & Jerk
||| 152.5 kg
||| 147.5 kg
||| 147.5 kg
|-bgcolor=#dfefff
|Total
||| 272.5 kg||| 270.0 kg
||| 267.5 kg|-
!colspan=7|67.5 kg
|-
|Snatch
||| 130.0 kg
||| 127.5 kg
||| 125.0 kg
|-
|Clean & Jerk
||| 172.5 kg
||| 167.5 kg
||| 167.5 kg
|-bgcolor=#dfefff
|Total||| 302.5 kg
||| 295.0 kg||| 292.5 kg
|-
!colspan=7|75 kg
|-
|Snatch
||| 147.5 kg
||| 145.0 kg
||| 142.5 kg
|-
|Clean & Jerk
||| 185.0 kg
||| 180.0 kg
||| 177.5 kg 
|-bgcolor=#dfefff
|Total
| || 330.0 kg||| 322.5 kg
||| 320.0 kg|-
!colspan=7|82.5 kg
|-
|Snatch
||| 157.5 kg
||| 150.0 kg
||| 145.0 kg
|-
|Clean & Jerk
||| 195.0 kg
||| 190.0 kg
||| 190.0 kg
|-bgcolor=#dfefff
|Total||| 352.5 kg
||| 335.0 kg||| 332.5 kg
|-
!colspan=7|90 kg
|-
|Snatch
||| 165.0 kg
||| 155.0 kg
||| 155.0 kg
|-
|Clean & Jerk
||| 202.5 kg
||| 200.0 kg
||| 200.0 kg
|-bgcolor=#dfefff
|Total
||| 367.5 kg||| 352.5 kg
||| 350.0 kg|-
!colspan=7|110 kg
|-
|Snatch
||| 177.5 kg
||| 162.5 kg
||| 157.5 kg
|-
|Clean & Jerk
||| 222.5 kg
||| 205.0 kg
||| 200.0 kg
|-bgcolor=#dfefff
|Total||| 400.0 kg
||| 362.5 kg||| 355.0 kg
|- 
!colspan=7|+110 kg
|-
|Snatch
||| 177.5 kg
||| 172.5 kg
||| 170.0 kg
|-
|Clean & Jerk
||| 240.0 kg
||| 225.0 kg
||| 215.0 kg
|-bgcolor=#dfefff
|Total
||| 417.5 kg||| 395.0 kg
||| 387.5 kg|}

Medal table
Ranking by Big''' (Total result) medals

References
Results (Chidlovski.net)
М. Л. Аптекарь.  «Тяжёлая атлетика. Справочник.» — М.: «Физкультура и спорт», 1983. — 416 с. 

European Weightlifting Championships
European Weightlifting Championships
European Weightlifting Championships
International weightlifting competitions hosted by Spain
Sports competitions in Madrid